The Scottish Junior Curling Championships takes place every year with eight men's and women's teams playing off to try to win the title and represent Scotland at the World Junior Curling Championships. The host city is Aberdeen, where the curling takes place at Curl Aberdeen. The Scottish Junior Curling Championships dates back to 1975. However, the Annual of the RCCC for 1971-72 includes a photograph of Winners of the Scottish Junior Championship at Aberdeen: J. Miller (lead), D. Halkerston (2nd), P. Drysdale (3rd), John McLaren (skip), being presented with trophy. , the reigning men's champion is James Craik and the reigning women's champion is Amy Bryce.

Past champions

References

See also
Scottish Men's Curling Championship
Scottish Women's Curling Championship
Scottish Mixed Curling Championship
Scottish Mixed Doubles Curling Championship
Scottish Senior Curling Championships
Scottish Schools Curling Championship
Scottish Wheelchair Curling Championship

Curling competitions in Scotland
Recurring sporting events established in 1975
Recurring sporting events established in 1981
National curling championships